Joseph Burns (born 19 July 1906, date of death unknown) was an Ulster Unionist member of the Parliament of Northern Ireland. He represented North Londonderry from 1960 to 1973.

Born in Belfast and educated at Rainey Endowed School, Magherafelt, County Londonderry and New York University, he was an auctioneer and valuer, a farmer in Canada and a stockbroker. In 1920, he joined the Ulster Special Constabulary.

He served as Assistant Parliamentary Secretary at the Ministry of Finance and Assistant Whip from 1968 until 1969, when he resigned his post. He was chairman of the '66 Committee of Unionist backbenchers from 1970. He served as Parliamentary Secretary to the Ministry of Health and Social Services from 1971 until the prorogation of the Parliament in 1972. He was Chairman of the United Unionist Action Council in 1977.

Sources

Biographies of Members of the Northern Ireland House of Commons 

1906 births
Year of death missing
New York University alumni
Ulster Unionist Party members of the House of Commons of Northern Ireland
Members of the House of Commons of Northern Ireland 1958–1962
Members of the House of Commons of Northern Ireland 1962–1965
Members of the House of Commons of Northern Ireland 1965–1969
Members of the House of Commons of Northern Ireland 1969–1973
Northern Ireland junior government ministers (Parliament of Northern Ireland)
People educated at Rainey Endowed School
Politicians from Belfast
British stockbrokers
Members of the House of Commons of Northern Ireland for County Londonderry constituencies